Menge-Hansen Marine Ways is a national historic site located at 5605 Palm Beach Boulevard, Fort Myers, Florida in Lee County. It is a shipyard on the Orange River built in the 1880s.

It was added to the National Register of Historic Places in 2009.

References

National Register of Historic Places in Lee County, Florida
Fort Myers, Florida